Broadway for Orlando is a charitable initiative to provide support to the victims of the Orlando nightclub shooting.

History
Founded in June 2016 by Broadway Records, it sponsored a re-recording of Hal David's and Burt Bacharach's 1965 song, What the World Needs Now, sung by an all-star cast of Broadway artists. The organization is committing to donate 100% of the proceeds from the sale of this recording to the GLBT Community Center of Central Florida.

The idea was conceived by James Wesley. Seth Rudetsky served as music director. Michael J. Moritz Jr. and Michael Croiter produced the track. The track was released by Broadway Records.

List of artists
According to the Broadway for Orlando website, artists participating in the recording included:

 Sara Bareilles
 Kristen Bell
 Wayne Brady
 Matthew Broderick
 Andréa Burns
 Ann Hampton Callaway
 Liz Callaway
 Len Cariou
 Paul Castree
 Michael Cerveris
 Joshua Colley
 Lilla Crawford
 Carmen Cusack
 Darius de Haas
 Fran Drescher
 Gloria Estefan
 Kimiko Glenn
 Whoopi Goldberg
 Renée Elise Goldsberry
 Joel Grey
 Sean Hayes
 Nina Hennessy
 James Monroe Iglehart
 Julie James 
 Carole King
 Judy Kuhn
 Nathan Lane
 Anika Larsen
 Zachary Levi
 Jose Llana
 Rebecca Luker
 Andrea Martin
 Audra McDonald
 Idina Menzel
 Janet Metz
 Lin-Manuel Miranda
 Brian Stokes Mitchell
 Jessie Mueller
 Donna Murphy
 Rosie O’Donnell
 Kelli O’Hara
 Rory O’Malley
 Orfeh
 Sarah Jessica Parker
 Christine Pedi
 Rosie Perez
 Bernadette Peters
 Billy Porter
 Alice Ripley
 Chita Rivera
 Seth Rudetsky
 Keala Settle
 Kate Shindle
 Jennifer Simard
 Will Swenson
 Rachel Tucker
 Tommy Tune
 Jonah Verdon
 James Wesley
 Juli Wesley
 Lillias White
 Edith Windsor
 Marissa Jaret Winokur
 BD Wong
 Tony Yazbeck

The recording was made available on iTunes as well as on the Broadway Records website.

The group subsequently performed the single on the June 21, 2016 episode of Maya & Marty with slight changes in the cast. The ensemble on the broadcast included:

Roger Bart
Steven Boyer
Charles Busch
Ann Hampton Callaway
Liz Callaway
Len Cariou
Paul Castree
Michael Cerveris
Kevin Chamberlin
Josh Colley
Lilla Crawford
Carmen Cusack
Darius de Haas
Carole Demas
Fran Drescher
Cynthia Erivo
Brian G. Gallagher
Victor Garber
Frankie Grande
Joel Grey
Sean Hayes
Megan Hilty
Christopher Scott Icenogle
Bill Irwin
Julie James
Judy Kuhn
Anika Larsen
Liz Larsen
Norm Lewis
Jose Llana
Lorna Luft
Beth Malone
Andrea Martin
Janet Metz
Brian Stokes Mitchell
Debra Monk
Jessie Mueller
Lacretta Nicole
Kelli O'Hara
Rory O'Malley
Orfeh
Laura Osnes
Christine Pedi
Rosie Perez
Billy Porter
Alice Ripley
Chita Rivera
Seth Rudetsky
Maya Rudolph
Keala Settle
Marc Shaiman
Kate Shindle
Martin Short
Jennifer Simard
Kenan Thompson
Rachel Tucker
Jonah Verdon
Max Von Essen
James Wesley
Juli Wesley
Lillias White
Marissa Jaret Winokur
BD Wong
Tony Yazbeck

The group performed on July 27, 2016 at the 2016 Democratic National Convention with the following cast:

Kristen Bell
Stephanie J. Block
Ann Hampton Callaway
Liz Callaway
Len Cariou
Michelle Collins
Jon Viktor Corpuz
Darren Criss
Wilson Cruz
Carmen Cusack
Tyne Daly
Van Dean
Darius de Haas
Lena Hall
Melissa Errico
Nicholas Callaway Foster
Sharon Gless
Montego Glover
Mary Ann Hu
Richard Kind
Anika Larsen
Michael Longoria
Audra McDonald
Idina Menzel
Olga Merediz
Debra Messing
Janet Metz
Brian Stokes Mitchell
Rosie Perez
Eve Plumb
Alice Ripley
Seth Rudetsky
Roz Ryan
Margaret Stallings
Michael Urie
Ben Vereen
Adrienne Warren
James Wesley
Juli Wesley
Tom Wopat

References

Charity in the United States
Orlando nightclub shooting